The Tennessee Maneuver Area was a training area in Middle Tennessee, comprising the following counties: Bedford, Cannon, Coffee, DeKalb, Hickman, Humphreys, Jackson, Lawrence, Maury, Moore, Perry, Putnam, Rutherford, Smith, Sumner, Trousdale, Warren, Wayne, White, Williamson, and Wilson.  The area was selected because the terrain resembled that of France, Belgium, and Germany.

In June 1941, Major General George S. Patton conducted maneuvers with the 2nd Armored Division in the vicinity of Manchester, Tennessee, where he soundly defeated the opposing forces, using large-scale armored tactics based on Bedford Forrest’s cavalry doctrine.  These maneuvers led to the creation of the Tennessee Maneuver Area.

On 24 June 1942, Governor Prentice Cooper, announced that nine counties would be used as a maneuver area by the Second Army, and the area was eventually expanded to twenty-one counties by 1944.  By 25 July 1942, the War Department selected Cumberland University, in Lebanon, Tennessee as the location of the Headquarters for the Army Ground Forces field problems, commonly known as the Tennessee Maneuvers.

Between 1942 and 1944, in seven large scale training exercises, more than 850,000 soldiers were trained in the Tennessee Maneuver Area. Training activities in the Tennessee Maneuver Area were suspended in March 1944 because of the great acceleration of overseas shipment of units in advance of the D-Day landings.

Units Trained in Tennessee Maneuver Area

*Entered maneuver area as IV Armored Corps, re-designated XX Corps on 10 October 1943.

References

External links
 Second Army (Tennessee) Maneuvers

1942 establishments in Tennessee
1944 disestablishments in Tennessee
Military installations in Tennessee
Military installations closed in 1944
Installations of the U.S. Army in Tennessee